The Hobart Zoo (also known as Beaumaris Zoo) was an old-fashioned zoological garden located on the Queen's Domain in Hobart, Tasmania, Australia. The Zoo site is very close to the site of the Tasmanian Governor's House, and the Botanical Gardens. Although its location is now primarily the site of a Hobart City Council depot, some remnants and archaeological remains of the original Zoo can still be seen.

The Zoo was set in the surrounds of sweeping gardens, and had commanding views across the River Derwent.

Thylacines

The Hobart Zoo is most famous for being the location where footage of the last known living Tasmanian tiger or thylacine was taken in 1936. It died in captivity in Hobart Zoo on 7 September 1936. National Threatened Species Day has been held annually since 1996 on 7 September in Australia, to commemorate the death of the last officially recorded thylacine.

History

The zoo was originally called Beaumaris Zoo, and was opened in 1895 at the private residence (named "Beaumaris") of Hobart socialite Mary Grant Roberts. Mrs. Roberts owned and operated the zoo from 1895 until her death in 1921. This zoo, which included a breeding programme for Tasmanian devils, rehabilitated the image of native animals and attracted scientific interest in them.

1922 

After Mrs Robert's death, the family offered the Beaumaris zoological collection to the Hobart City Council, which accepted the offer in January 1922 on condition that the Tasmanian State Government gave a subsidy towards the zoo. A subsidy of  £250 per annum was approved on 10 February 1922 by the Tasmanian State Government and appropriated for the new zoo.

In March 1922, the Hobart City Council advertised for a curator to take care of the Beaumaris zoological collection that were still housed on the Roberts property. On the evening of 27 March the Hobart City Council Reserves Committee held a meeting to consider the applicants for the curator's position. Arthur Reid was appointed as curator of the future municipal zoological gardens not yet constructed at the time.

Arthur Reid, the new curator who had been born in Edinburgh, Scotland, had emigrated to Tasmania at the age of 21, and had been an avid naturalist since boyhood. When he had come to Tasmania, Reid had taken a special interest in the rearing of pheasants and English birds. Reid died aged 70 years on 13 December 1935.

On 30 May 1922, Reid left for an 18-day tour of various Australian zoos, including Taronga Park Zoo, Melbourne Zoo and a zoo in Ballarat. Reid was tasked to inspect the various enclosure designs, zoological collections, and gain experience in the management methods of these facilities. On his return, he was to advise the Reserves Committee of his findings. Reid also intended to arrange the exchange of birds and animals with these zoos. Tenders had been put out during May for the construction of the new boundary fence that was to surround the chosen site for the new zoological gardens. Once returned, Reid was also tasked with the supervision of overseeing the transfer of the Roberts collection over to the new site, once the enclosures were completed.

The original Roberts collection had suffered losses during the time period between the death of Mrs Roberts and the acquiring of the collection by the Hobart City Council. The Tasmanian devils that had been at the forefront of the Beaumaris collection were no longer present. Only one thylacine was noted, which had been in ill health but recovering due to Reid's care. A new pair of Tasmanian devils had been promised to replace those that had died. Other animals listed including wallabies, kangaroos, possums as well as varying species of birds were all reported as being in the best of health.

In July the Reserves Committee received a report from Curator Reid, after an article in the Illustrated Tasmanian Mail (22 June 1922) alleged animal welfare issues amongst the animals housed at the Roberts property at Battery Point. Reid reported that the Tasmanian devils had been disposed of before the Hobart City Council had taken the collection over. He had also advised that there had been an aged wallaby which had died, and the 'wolf' (referring to the thylacine) had not had a mate for over two years. No wombats were present in the collection, and a squirrel had not had a mate for 18 months. He had also destroyed what was termed as a 'native cat' (quoll). 48 animals were noted as being in the collection on 19 April 1922, with further additions bringing the total to 54 animals, by Reid in his report to the Reserves Committee. 100 birds were also present in the collection.

During late August a large wedgetail eagle, caught in a rabbit trap, was captured in Pyengana, Tasmania, by a representative of the Nestlé Milk Company. The bird of prey was then sent to Hobart for addition to the zoo, where it was cared for by Curator Reid.

In September members of the public gave the future zoo a pair of Tasmanian devils, as well as black and grey possums.

By early October, the boundary fence around the zoo site had been completed, workmen were putting finishing touches to the large pond which would house the collection of water birds, and the animal enclosures aviaries and runs were nearing completion. Some construction was delayed due to a hold up in the supply of wire netting from Sydney. A pair of African lions were donated by the Taronga Park Zoo. An echidna, wallabies, possums, eagles and more Tasmanian devils were further donated by various members of the public then added to the collection still housed at Battery Point. During mid-October the sole remaining thylacine from the Roberts collection died of pneumonia. Its remains were sent away to be preserved for future display.

With its loss, the Hobart City Council sent an appeal to the public for another live specimen to be obtained for the zoo. Tenders had been received for the construction of the curator's office, a tea kiosk and other buildings.

Through the month of November, progress on the construction of the zoo was nearing completion. The site was now fully enclosed by the new boundary fence, aviaries and enclosures were almost finished. Accommodation was being made ready for a long list of animals and birds, including deer, emu, ostrich, and peafowl.  A terraced enclosure for the African lions had been started with cuts made into the sandstone of the hill. The design plan was to have the enclosure viewable, from both above and below, with a moat at the front, and concrete walls on the sides, some 40 feet wide with a den area attached. A large figure of eight pond was now a feature of the site, 300 feet in circumference for the aquatic birds, an arched bridge for the pond was also in the planning stages. Trees, shrubs and flower beds were being planted around the site. The Reserves Committee had also accepted tenders for the construction of an office and store. Provision had yet to be provided for a tea house and public lavatory.

On 29 November the Tasmanian Legislative Council approved a clause in the Hobart Corporation Bill for the Hobart City Council to "...establish and maintain zoological gardens to be known as the Beaumaris Zoo in such portion of the Queen's Domain as it may determine, and also to expend on the zoo such annual sum as the Council may think proper."

1923 

By the end of January 1923 the new zoo was ready to be opened. The animals were transferred from the old Beaumaris property at Battery Point, to the new zoological facility by the Hobart City Council at the rehabilitated quarry site at the Queen's Domain, on 1 February 1923. An aged kangaroo, however, died shortly after arriving at the Queen's Domain site. The African lions, due from Taronga Park Zoo, had not yet arrived in time for the impending official opening on 2 February.

The official opening ceremony took place on the Friday afternoon of 2 February 1923 officiated by Alderman Williams, who performed the opening ceremony in the absence of the mayor, Alderman McKenzie. Ida Roberts, the daughter of Mary Grant Roberts, who had donated the original Beaumaris zoological collection to the Hobart City Council, was also present at the opening of the new Beaumaris Zoological Gardens. The zoo contained at the time of opening 100 animals and 220 birds.

On the opening day the two Tasmanian devils that had been given to the zoo escaped from their enclosure, and were later found hiding under a culvert. Despite efforts to recapture the escapees the marsupials eluded zoo staff. The animals were recaptured on 17 February after Curator Reid built a box trap baited with lambs heart, and left it near the culvert where the pair had been hiding.

The gate that currently secures the site was installed on 9 September 2000 (World Threatened Species Day). It was designed to communicate the history of the site to the passing public, and secure the site, and won an award in 2001 for landscape design from the Australian Institute of Landscape Architects.

Closure
The Zoo was closed in 1937 due to severe financial problems. The site was acquired by the Royal Australian Navy and converted into a fuel storage depot for the nearby  shore base. The Navy used the site from 1943 until 1991, when it reverted to the Hobart City Council and was used as a storage depot.

The future
A conservation plan was published in 1967 as The Beaumaris zoo site conservation plan. Proposals even as late as 2003 were for then future uses of the site, which previously included proposals as a sculpture park for Tasmanian artists, and as a wildlife rehabilitation centre. The plan to build a new zoo had been in mind for a few years. However, the property, described as a "national treasure" and as "a special place in the state's history", was sold at auction in 2019 for $3.9 million Australian dollars (two and three-quarter million $USD). It is now a 16-room privately owned family home.

References

External links

History of Tasmania
Zoos in Tasmania
1895 establishments in Australia
1937 disestablishments in Australia
Former zoos
Parks in Tasmania
Defunct tourist attractions in Australia
Zoos established in 1895
Zoos disestablished in 1937